"The Dark End of the Street" is a 1967 soul song, written by songwriters Dan Penn and Chips Moman and first recorded by James Carr.  It became his trademark song, reaching number 10 on Billboard Magazine's R&B Chart, and crossing over to number 77 on the Billboard Hot 100.

History and original recording
The song was co-written by Penn, a professional songwriter and producer, and Moman, a former session guitarist at Gold Star Studio in Los Angeles and also the owner of American Sound Studio in Memphis, Tennessee. The song itself was ultimately recorded across town at Royal Studios, home of HI Records.

In the summer of 1966, while a DJ convention was being held in Memphis, Penn and Moman were cheating while playing cards with Florida DJ Don Schroeder, and decided to write the song while on a break. Penn said of the song “We were always wanting to come up with the best cheatin’ song. Ever.” The duo went to the hotel room of Quinton Claunch, another Muscle Shoals alumnus, and founder of Hi Records, to write. Claunch told them, "Boys, you can use my room on one condition, which is that you give me that song for James Carr. They said I had a deal, and they kept their word.” The song, lyrics and all, was written in about thirty minutes.

Chart performance

Influences
Van Morrison's song "Bright Side of the Road" includes the lyrics "From the dark end of the street, to the bright side of the road," which some people believe was influenced by Penn and Moman's song.

Cover versions 
In the years since Carr's original version, many artists have recorded versions of the song. The following are the most notable releases:
 1967 - Six months after the Carr release, fellow soul singer Percy Sledge included his version of the song on his 1967 album The Percy Sledge Way, but it did not chart as high.
 1967 – Prince Buster, single
 1968 – Joe Tex, released on Soul Country
 1968 – Dolly Parton and Porter Wagoner, released on Just the Two of Us
 1969 – Flying Burrito Brothers, released on The Gilded Palace of Sin
 1969 – Lee Hazlewood, Ann-Margret, released on The Cowboy and the Lady
 1970 – Aretha Franklin, released on This Girl's in Love with You
 1972 – Lee Moses, single
 1972 – Ry Cooder, released on Boomer's Story
 1974 – Linda Ronstadt, released on Heart Like a Wheel
 1976 – Richard & Linda Thompson, released on (guitar, vocal)
 1982 – Moving Hearts, released on Dark End of the Street
 1988 -  Bobby King and Terry Evans, released on Live and Let Live. (Rounder Records) 
 1989 – Deacon Blue, a live version B-side of their "Love and Regret" single
 1989 – Don Dixon, EEE
 1991 – The Commitments, released on "The Commitments Soundtrack"
 1993 – Gary Stewart, released on I'm a Texan
 1993 – The Afghan Whigs, released as a b-side to the single, "Gentlemen" and the 1994 EP, "What Jail Is Like EP"
 1994 – Diamanda Galás and John Paul Jones, released on The Sporting Life
 1997 - Eva Cassidy, released on Eva by Heart
 1997 – Gregg Allman, released on Searching for Simplicity
 1996 – Kevin Mahogany, released on Kevin Mahogany
 1999 – Elvis Costello, released on Kojak Variety (2004 bonus disc version)
 2004 – Troy Cassar-Daley, released on Borrowed & Blue
 2005 – Frank Black, released on Honeycomb
 2008 – Eels, released on Useless Trinkets: B-Sides, Soundtracks, Rarities and Unreleased 1996–2006
 2008 – Cat Power, released on Matador Records as part of the Dark End of the Street EP
 2016 – The Hidden Cameras, released on Outside Music as part of Home On Native Land
 2016 – Jimmy Barnes feat Dan Penn, released on Soul Searchin'
 2019 – June Tabor & Oysterband released on Fire & Fleet
 2021 – Dave Gahan / Soulsavers, single

References

Bibliography
 Gordon, Robert (2001). It Came from Memphis. Atria. 
 Guralnick, Peter (2002). Sweet Soul Music. MOJO Books. 
 Hoskyns, Barney (1998). Say it One Time for the Broken Hearted. Bloomsbury Publishing PLC. 

Rhythm and blues songs
1967 singles
1967 songs
Songs about infidelity
Songs about streets
Songs written by Chips Moman
Songs written by Dan Penn
Aretha Franklin songs
Black Francis songs
Eels (band) songs
Eva Cassidy songs